Gatley is a surname. Notable people with the surname include:
 
 Alfred Gatley (1816–1863), English sculptor
 George G. Gatley (1868—1931), United States Army officer
 Ian Gatley, former Provost and Vice President of New Jersey Institute of Technology, US
 Lyle Gatley (born 1945), Canadian Olympic rower

See also
 Gamley